Ricquelle Kristina Farquharson (born 12 November 1998) is an American-raised Jamaican footballer who plays as a goalkeeper for the Jamaica women's national team. She played in college for the University of South Florida.

International career
Farquharson made her senior debut for Jamaica on 6 October 2019.

References 

1998 births
Living people
Women's association football goalkeepers
Jamaican women's footballers
Jamaica women's international footballers
American women's soccer players
Soccer players from Florida
Sportspeople from Broward County, Florida
People from Davie, Florida
African-American women's soccer players
American people of Jamaican descent
South Florida Bulls women's soccer players
21st-century African-American sportspeople
21st-century African-American women